HWV may refer to:
 Händel-Werke-Verzeichnis, a catalogue of the works of composer George Frideric Handel
 Brookhaven Airport, in New York, United States
 Heathrow Terminal 5 station, in London